"The Impression That I Get" is a song by American ska punk band the Mighty Mighty Bosstones, released as the lead single from their fifth studio album, Let's Face It (1997), in February 1997. The track reached number one on the US Billboard Modern Rock Tracks chart and number 23 on the Billboard Hot 100 Airplay chart while also charting highly in Australia, Canada, and the United Kingdom. The song was certified gold in the United States and Australia. Chris Applebaum directed the song's music video while Adam Stern produced it.

Music
Musically the song is a mix of ska punk, alternative rock, punk rock, and reggae rock.

Background
More than a year before the release of Let's Face It, the song appeared on Safe and Sound: A Benefit in Response to the Brookline Clinic Violence; the album was released in response to the slayings of two abortion clinic workers in two different clinics in Brookline, Massachusetts on December 30, 1994.

Live performances
In 1998, a live version of this song appeared on Live from the Middle East. That same year, the Bosstones performed this song during their debut performance on Saturday Night Live.

Track listings

 US 7-inch single
 "The Impression That I Get"  – 3:15
 "At It Again"  – 2:04

 UK CD 1 and cassette single
 "The Impression That I Get"  – 3:15
 "Is It 2"  – 2:53

 UK CD 2
 "The Impression That I Get"  – 3:15
 "Wake Up Call"  – 2:16
 "So Many Ways"  – 2:38

 European CD single
 "The Impression That I Get"  – 3:15
 "Desensitized"  – 2:04
 "Is It"  – 2:53
 "Storm Hit"  – 3:15

 Australian CD single
 "The Impression That I Get"  – 3:13
 "Is It?"  – 2:53
 "Storm Hit"  – 3:14

Charts

Weekly charts

Year-end charts

Certifications

Release history

Usage in media
The song is featured on the soundtrack to the films Step Brothers, Chasing Amy, Fathers' Day, Krippendorf's Tribe, and Digimon: The Movie. The song is featured as a playable track in the 2009 video game Band Hero and the 2015 video game Rock Band 4. The song is often credited as the origin of the Disney Channel theme, however, the jingle was actually composed by Alex Lasarenko.

See also
 List of Billboard number-one alternative singles of the 1990s
 List of RPM Rock/Alternative number-one singles

References

External links
 

1996 songs
1997 singles
Mercury Records singles
The Mighty Mighty Bosstones songs
Music videos directed by Chris Applebaum
American alternative rock songs
Reggae rock songs